Joypurhat railway station is a railway station in Joypurhat, Bangladesh. It was established 1884 in the British Raj period and is situated in the central point of Joypurhat City. Joypurhat railway station is a very important station in the northern part of Bangladesh. The two biggest rail junctions, Santahar and Parbatipur, are very near to this station. Many trains serve this station daily to different parts of the country. Joypurhat is a border side district of Bangladesh and Hili land port is very close to Joypurhat, so many people who want to go to India, Nepal, or Bhutan can come to Joypurhat by railway. They can also go to Hili by railway from this station.

See also
 Joypurhat District
 Bangladesh Railway
 Santahar railway station
 Kamalapur railway station

References

Railway stations in Joypurhat District
Railway stations opened in 1884